Oriental Bank of Commerce (OBC) was an Indian public sector bank headquartered at Gurgaon, Haryana. It had 2390 branches and 2625 ATMs across India. In April 2020, the bank along with United Bank of India has been merged with Punjab National Bank, making the latter the second-largest public sector bank in India.

History
Its earliest date of incorporation per the Registrar of Companies is 1901. Rai Bahadur Lala Sohan Lal the first Chairman of the Bank, founded OBC in 1943 in Lahore. Within four years of its coming into existence, OBC had to face Partition. The bank had to close down its branches in the newly formed Pakistan and shift its registered office from Lahore to Amritsar. Lala Karam Chand Thapar, the then Chairman of the Bank, in a unique gesture honoured the commitments made to the depositors from Pakistan and paid every rupee to its departing customers.

The Bank has witnessed many ups and downs since its establishment. The period of 1970–76 is said to be the most challenging phase in the history of the Bank. At one time, profit plummeted to  175; that prompted the owner of the bank, the Thapar Group, to sell / close the bank. Then employees and leaders of the Bank came forward to rescue the Bank. The owners were moved and had to change their decision of selling the bank and in turn, they decided to improve the position of the bank with the active cooperation and support of all the employees. Their efforts bore fruits and performance of the bank improved significantly. This was the turning point in the history of the bank.

The bank was nationalised on 15 April 1980. At that time, OBC ranked 19th among the 20 nationalised banks.

In 1997, OBC acquired Bari Doab Bank and Punjab Cooperative Bank. The acquisition of these two banks brought with it no additional branches.

The bank has progressed on several fronts, crossing the Business Mix mark of  2,37,000 crore as on 31 March 2010 making it the seventh-largest Public Sector Bank in India.

On 14 August 2004, OBC amalgamated Global Trust Bank (GTB). GTB was a leading private sector bank in India that was associated with various financial discrepancies leading to a moratorium being imposed by RBI shortly before it merged into OBC. The acquisition brought with it 103 branches, which increased OBC's branch total to 1092. As per March 2018 – 2019 annual report, it has 2390 branches and 2625 ATM's pan India.

Amalgamation
On 30 August 2019, Finance Minister Nirmala Sitharaman announced that the Oriental Bank of Commerce and United Bank of India (UBI) would be merged with Punjab National Bank (PNB). MD and CEO of UBI, Ashok Kumar Pradhan, stated that the merged entity would begin functioning from 1 April 2020. The Union Cabinet approved the merger on 4 March 2020. PNB announced that its board had approved the merger ratios the next day. Shareholders of OBC and UBI would receive 1,150 shares and 121 shares of PNB, respectively, for every 1,000 shares they hold. The merge came into effect since 1 April 2020. Post merger, PNB has become the second largest public sector bank in India.

Chairmen
The Chairmen (CMD) of the bank were as under:

Overview
The bank offers a wide range of banking products and services such as deposit accounts, loans, debit cards, credit cards (with tie-up with SBI), Insurance products, ATMs, Internet banking, Mobile Banking, Self-banking halls, call centre, etc.

The Bank has launched yet another people's participation in the planning process at grass root level essentially to tackle the maladies of poverty. The Grameen Projects venture aims to alleviate poverty plus identify the reasons responsible for the failure or success.

OBC is already implementing a Grameen Project in Dehradun District (UK) and Hanumangarh District (Rajasthan). Formulated on the pattern of the Bangladesh Grameen Bank, the Scheme has a unique feature of disbursing small loans ranging from  75 (~US$1.50) onwards. The beneficiaries of the Grameen Project are mostly women. The Bank is engaged in providing training to rural folk in using locally available raw material to produce pickles, jams etc. This has provided self-employment and augmented income levels thus reforming lives of rural folk and encouraging cottage industries in rural areas.

OBC launched yet another unique scheme christened 'The Comprehensive Village Development Programme' on the auspicious day of Baisakhi, 13 April 1997 at three villages in Punjab namely Rurki Kalan (District. Sangrur), Raje Majra (District. Ropar) and Khaira Majha (District. Jaladhar) and two villages in Haryana, namely Khunga (District. Jind) and Narwal (District. Kaithal). The pilot launch was a great success. Emboldened by the success, Bank extended the programme to more villages. At present, it covers 15 villages; 10 in Punjab, 4 in Haryana and 1 in Rajasthan. The programme focuses on providing a comprehensive and integrated package providing rural finance to the villagers with Village Development as its focus, thus contributing towards infrastructural development and augmentation of income for each farmer of the village. The Bank has implemented 14-point action plan for strengthening of credit delivery to women and has designated 5 branches as specialised branches for women entrepreneurs.

Notes

References

Bibliography 
Annual Report 2019 
Baker, Henry D. (1915) British India: With Notes on Ceylon, Afghanistan, and Tibet. (U.S. Government Printing Office).

External links

 
 Oriental Bank Officers Association

Defunct banks of India
Indian companies established in 1943
Banks established in 1943
Banks disestablished in 2020
Companies formerly listed on the Bombay Stock Exchange
Companies listed on the National Stock Exchange of India
Companies nationalised by the Government of India
Companies based in New Delhi
Indian companies disestablished in 2020
Indian companies established in 1901